Glazkov is a Russian masculine surname, its feminine counterpart is Glazkova. Notable people with the surname include:
Anna Glazkova (born 1981), Belarusian rhythmic gymnast
Anzhelika Glazkova (born 1968), Russian politician
Georgy Glazkov (1911–1968), Soviet footballer and coach
Nikita Glazkov (born 1992), Russian fencer
Nikolay Glazkov (1919–1979), Russian poet and actor
Sergey Glazkov (born 1967), Soviet/Russian footballer
Vyacheslav Glazkov (born 1984), Ukrainian boxer
Yuri Glazkov (1939–2008), Soviet cosmonaut

See also
Glazkov culture, ancient Siberian culture

Russian-language surnames